Malabang Airport (Filipino: Paliparan ng Malabang)  is an airport located in the coastal town of Malabang, Lanao del Sur, Philippines. The Civil Aviation Authority of the Philippines classifies this 16.05-hectare facility as a community airport.

With no airlines serving the airport, the runway is frequently used for drying corn and coconut (copra).

References

Airports in the Philippines
Buildings and structures in Lanao del Sur